Grace Shokkos (born 4 August 1992) is a Congolese handball player for Poitiers Handball and the DR Congo national team.

References

1992 births
Living people
Democratic Republic of the Congo female handball players
Expatriate handball players
Democratic Republic of the Congo expatriates in France
Competitors at the 2019 African Games
African Games competitors for DR Congo
African Games medalists in handball
21st-century Democratic Republic of the Congo people
African Games bronze medalists for DR Congo